Fortuna Sachsenross Hannover is a German sports club for football and pétanque based in Hanover. The club's roots are convoluted and can be traced to several local clubs, the oldest of those going back to 1891.

History 
The Turnerbund Sachsenroß von 1891 was founded in a suburb of Hanover in 1891. The Arbeitersportverein List von 1893 followed two years later. Another ancestor of the club, Freie Turnerschaft Hannover, Abtlg. Buchholz was the first to offer football, but the football department left the club in 1923 to form an independent football club, since known as OSV Hannover. In 1924 the footballers of List, now renamed to  Freie Turnerschaft Hannover, Abtlg. List, also formed an independent club named Freie Sportvereinigung Wacker. Many members of Wacker joined the sports club of the local waterworks and in 1933 that club was renamed to Fortuna von 1933.

After World War II 74 former members of Wacker, Fortuna, and Buchholz founded the TSV Fortuna von 1946. When the local authorities moved Turnerbund Sachsenroß from their former residence at Clausewitzstraße to Wietzegraben Fortuna and Sachsenroß became neighbours. The city also wanted to support the local sports and thus planned to build larger sports facilities. A prerequisite was that Sachsenross and Fortuna would merge to form a joint club. TSV Fortuna/Sachsenroß von 1891 e.V. was thus founded in 1971.

Football 
Fortuna Sachsenross today offers men's football only. They have six senior men's sides and seventeen junior sides. The first men's team is playing in the seventh tier Kreisliga Hannover after relegation from the Bezirksliga Hannover via playoffs in 2016. The most well known former player of Fortuna Sachsenross is Mirko Slomka.

Women's football 
The club is most famous for its original women's football team, that was a member of the Bundesliga from 1990 to 1997. When in 1997 the two divisions of the Bundesliga were united to form a uniform Bundesliga Fortuna Sachsenross qualified, but decided to refrain from participating for financial reasons. The women's team was disbanded a few years later. A new women's section was established late in 2009 but played only in Hannover's city cup and was folded after that.

Statistics

References

External links 
 Official homepage

Football clubs in Germany
Defunct women's football clubs in Germany
Football clubs in Lower Saxony
Association football clubs established in 1971
1971 establishments in West Germany
Fortuna Sachsenross
Frauen-Bundesliga clubs